Central Coast Mariners Football Club is an Australian professional association football club based in Tuggerah, Gosford. The club was formed in 2005 and is one of the founding members of the A-League Men. The club has participated in every A-League Men season from its inception.

The list encompasses the honours won by Central Coast, records set by the club, their managers and their players. The player records section itemises the club's leading goalscorers and those who have made most appearances in first-team competitions. It also records notable achievements by Mariners players on the international stage, and the highest transfer fees paid and received by the club. Attendance records at Central Coast Stadium, the club's home ground since its formation, and other temporary home grounds, are also included.

Central Coast Mariners have won four top-flight titles. The club's record appearance maker is John Hutchinson, who made 271 appearances between 2005 and 2015. Matt Simon is Central Coast Mariners' record goalscorer, scoring 66 goals in total.

All figures are correct as of the match played on 11 March 2023.

Honours and achievements
The Mariners' first ever silverware was won shortly after their foundation, in the 2005 A-League Pre-Season Challenge Cup. They next won the A-League Premiership in 2007–08, which they won again in 2011–12.

Domestic
 A-League Men Premiership
Winners (2) : 2007–08, 2011–12
Runners-up (2): 2010–11, 2012–13

 A-League Men Championship 
Winners (1) : 2013
Runners-up (3): 2006, 2008, 2011

Australia Cup
Runners-up (1): 2021

A-League Pre-Season Challenge Cup
Winners (1): 2005
Runners-up (1): 2006

Current first-team squad statistics 

Ordered by squad number.Appearances include cup appearances, including as substitute. Includes Academy players who train regularly with the first-team and who have made at least one previous league appearance.

Player records

All current players are in bold

Appearances
 Most A-League Men appearances: John Hutchinson, 228
 Most Australia Cup appearances: Storm Roux, 8
 Most Asian appearances: John Hutchinson, 24
 Youngest first-team player: Anthony Kalik, 16 years, 347 days (against Palm Beach, FFA Cup, 14 October 2014)
 Oldest first-team player: Ian Ferguson, 38 years, 248 days (against Melbourne Victory, A-League, 18 November 2005)
 Most consecutive appearances: Alex Wilkinson, 107 (from 4 November 2007 to 13 March 2011)
 Most separate spells with the club: Matt Simon, 3 (2006–12; 2013–15 and 2018–2022)

Most appearances
Competitive matches only, includes appearances as substitute. Numbers in brackets indicate goals scored.

a. Includes the A-League Pre-Season Challenge Cup and Australia Cup
b. Includes goals and appearances (including those as a substitute) in the 2005 Australian Club World Championship Qualifying Tournament.

Goalscorers
Most goals in a season: 19 – Daniel McBreen, 2012–13
Most league goals in a season: 17 – Daniel McBreen, A-League, 2012–13
Most goals in a match: 4 – Matt Sim v  Palm Beach, 
Most goals in a league match: 3
Daniel McBreen v Sydney FC, 
Michael McGlinchey v Melbourne Victory, 
Goals in most consecutive matches: 4
John Aloisi, 9 December 2007 – 31 December 2007
Matt Simon, 12 January 2011 – 31 January 2011
Fastest league goal: 14 seconds – Matt Simon v North Queensland Fury, 11 October 2009
Fastest hat-trick: 18 minutes – Matt Sim v Palm Beach, 
Fastest league hat-trick: 28 minutes – Daniel McBreen v Sydney FC, 
Youngest goalscorer: Garang Kuol – 17 years, 98 days (against APIA Leichhardt, FFA Cup, 21 December 2021)
Oldest goalscorer: Patrick Zwaanswijk – 38 years, 94 days (against Western Sydney Wanderers, A-League Grand Final, 21 April 2013)

Top goalscorers
Competitive matches only, includes appearances as substitute. Numbers in brackets indicate goals scored.

a. Includes the A-League Pre-Season Challenge Cup and Australia Cup
b. Includes goals and appearances (including those as a substitute) in the 2005 Australian Club World Championship Qualifying Tournament.

Award winners

Joe Marston Medal

The following players have won the Joe Marston Medal while playing for Central Coast Mariners:
 Mat Ryan – 2011
 Daniel McBreen – 2013

Harry Kewell Medal

The following players have won the Harry Kewell Medal while playing for Central Coast Mariners:
 Mat Ryan – 2011–12

Young Footballer of the Year

The following players have won the A-League Men Young Footballer of the Year award while playing for Central Coast Mariners:
 Mat Ryan – 2010–11
 Mat Ryan – 2011–12

Golden Boot

The following players have won the Golden Boot while playing for Central Coast Mariners:

 Stewart Petrie – 2005–06
 Daniel McBreen – 2012–13

International

This section refers to caps won while a Central Coast Mariners FC player.

 First capped player: Michael Beauchamp, for Australia against Bahrain on 23 February 2006)
 Most capped player: Michael McGlinchey with 27 caps.
 Most capped player for Australia: Mitchell Duke and Tom Rogic with 4 caps.
 First player to play in the World Cup finals: Michael Beauchamp

Transfers

Record transfer fees received

Club records

Matches

Firsts
 First match: Central Coast Mariners 3–0 Gladesville Spirit, friendly, 30 March 2005
 First A-League Men match: Perth Glory 0–1 Central Coast Mariners, 26 August 2005
 First national cup match: Central Coast Mariners 3–1 Queensland Roar, A-League Pre-Season Challenge Cup group stage, 23 July 2005
 First Asian match: Central Coast Mariners 0–0 Pohang Steelers, AFC Champions League group stage, 11 September 2009
 First match at Gosford: Central Coast Mariners 0–0 (4–2 pen.) Newcastle Jets, Oceania Club Championship qualification

Record wins
 Record A-League Men win:
 5–0 against Perth Glory, 30 October 2011
 7–2 against Sydney FC, 3 November 2012
 5–0 against Wellington Phoenix, 7 February 2013
 5–0 against Wellington Phoenix, 5 April 2022
 Record national cup win: 6–0 against APIA Leichhardt, FFA Cup quarter-finals, 21 December 2021
 Record Asian win: 5–1 against Tianjin TEDA, AFC Champions League, 1 March 2012

Record defeats
 Record A-League Men defeat:
 2–8 against Newcastle Jets, 14 April 2018
 2–8 against Wellington Phoenix, 9 March 2019
 Record national cup defeat: 0–3 against Adelaide United, Round of 32, 1 August 2018
 Record Asian defeat: 0–5 against Kawasaki Frontale, AFC Champions League group stage, 8 April 2009

Record consecutive results
 Record consecutive wins: 6, from 19 November 2011 to 23 December 2011
 Record consecutive defeats: 11, from 19 January 2020 — 18 July 2020
 Record consecutive draws: 3, from 9 January 2010 — 22 January 2010
 Record consecutive matches without a defeat: 15, from 29 October 2011 to 21 January 2012
 Record consecutive matches without a win: 19, from 10 March 2018 to 12 January 2019
 Record consecutive wins coming from behind: 2, from 3 February 2021 to 7 February 2021
 Record consecutive matches without conceding a goal: 5, from 24 August 2007 to 23 September 2007
 Record consecutive matches without scoring a goal: 4
 from 27 August 2006 to 17 September 2006
 from 10 December 2017 to 31 December 2017

Goals
 Most league goals scored in a season: 50 in 30 matches, A-League, 2010–11
 Fewest league goals scored in a season: 22 in 21 matches, A-League, 2006–07
 Most league goals conceded in a season:
 70 in 27 matches, A-League, 2015–16
 70 in 27 matches, A-League, 2018–19
 Fewest conceded in a season: 22 in 27 matches, A-League, 2012–13

Points
 Most points in a season: 57 in 30 matches, A-League, 2010–11
 Fewest points in a season: 
 13 in 27 matches, A-League, 2015–16
 13 in 27 matches, A-League, 2018–19

Attendances
 Highest home attendance: 36,354 against Newcastle Jets, 2008 A-League Grand Final, 24 February 2008
 Highest attendance at Gosford: 19,238 against Newcastle Jets, A-League, 12 January 2008
 Lowest attendance at Gosford: 2,168 against Sanfrecce Hiroshima, AFC Champions League group stage, 11 March 2014

References

Central Coast Mariners
Central Coast Mariners FC